The Adventures of Puss in Boots is an American computer-animated web television series. It stars the character Puss in Boots from the DreamWorks Animation Shrek franchise. The series debuted on January 16, 2015, on Netflix, when the first five episodes of the first season were released. The sixth and final season was released on January 26, 2018.

Series overview

Episodes

Season 1 (2015)

Season 2 (2015)

Season 3 (2016)

Season 4 (2016)

Season 5 (2017)

Season 6 (2018)

Specials

Interactive special (2017)

References

Lists of American children's animated television series episodes